Shek Pai Wan or Aberdeen Bay is a bay between Aberdeen on Hong Kong Island and Ap Lei Chau (formerly Aberdeen Island). Its name was formerly romanized as Shekpywan. The bay is one of the traditional fishery ports because the hills on two sides forms a nature shelter. The whole bay is zoned as the Aberdeen West Typhoon Shelter.

Education
Shek Pai Wan is in Primary One Admission (POA) School Net 18. Within the school net are multiple aided schools (operated independently but funded with government money) and Hong Kong Southern District Government
Primary School.

See also
Shek Pai Wan Estate

References

External links

 Map of Shek Pai Wan

Bays of Hong Kong
Ap Lei Chau
Aberdeen, Hong Kong